Conveying the Child's Coffin (A Child's Funeral) is a painting by Finnish painter Albert Edelfelt completed in 1879.

The painting depicts a rowing boat on the sea outside Haiko, Porvoo in Finland on a sunny late summer morning. In the foreground the brown-tarred rowing boat contains three peasant women, two men and a girl and a coffin.

The painting is on display at Ateneum in Helsinki, Finland.

References 

1879 paintings
Paintings by Albert Edelfelt
Paintings in the collection of the Ateneum
Paintings of people